Ukraine's 2nd electoral district is a Verkhovna Rada constituency in the Autonomous Republic of Crimea. Established in its current form in 2012, it includes part of the city of Simferopol and part of Simferopol Raion. The constituency is home to 150,497 registered voters and has 98 polling stations. Since the Annexation of Crimea by the Russian Federation in 2014, the seat has been vacant.

Ukraine's 2nd electoral district bordered is by the 1st and 10th districts to the west, the 7th district to the southwest and the 8th to the east and the north.

Members of Parliament

Elections

2012

See also
Electoral districts of Ukraine
Foreign electoral district of Ukraine

References

Electoral districts of Ukraine
Constituencies established in 2012